Christina Höj Larsen (born 1971) is a Swedish politician and former member of the Riksdag, the national legislature. A member of the Left Party, she represented Västernorrland County between October 2010 and September 2022.

Höj Larsen is the daughter of metalworker Bjarne Larsen and medical secretary Susanne Howalt Larsen (née Höj).

References

1971 births
Living people
Members of the Riksdag 2010–2014
Members of the Riksdag 2014–2018
Members of the Riksdag 2018–2022
Members of the Riksdag from the Left Party (Sweden)
People from Härnösand Municipality
Women members of the Riksdag
21st-century Swedish women politicians